Jamin may refer to:

Bible 
 Jamin (biblical figure), any of three different Biblical figures

People

Given name 
Jamin Davis (born 1998), American football player
Jamin Elliott (born 1979), American football player
Jamin Olivencia (born 1985), American professional wrestler
Jamin Pugh (1984–2023), American professional wrestler
Jamin Raskin (born 1962) American politician
Jamin Ruhren (born 1977), American drag queen 
Jamin Winans (born 1977), American filmmaker, writer, and composer

Surname 
Hanniel Jamin (born 1994), Ghanaian beauty pageant titleholder
Jules Jamin (1818–1886), French physicist
Jules Crépieux-Jamin (1859–1940), French graphologist
Paul Jamin (1853–1903), French painter
Pierre Jamin (born 1987), French footballer
Thierry Jamin (born 1967), French explorer and historian

Geography
Jamin, Iran, a village in Kermanshah Province, Iran
Jamin (Arunachal Pradesh), a city in the state of Arunachal Pradesh, India

See also 
Jamin interferometer, device invented by physicist Jules Jamin